Josef Schmitt (21 March 1908 – 16 April 1980) was a German international footballer who played for 1. FC Nürnberg. In 1928, he appeared twice for the Germany national football team, scoring one goal. He was also part of Germany's team at the 1928 Summer Olympics, but he did not play in any matches.

References

External links
 
 

1908 births
1980 deaths
Footballers from Nuremberg
German footballers
Germany international footballers
1. FC Nürnberg players
Olympic footballers of Germany
Footballers at the 1928 Summer Olympics
Association football forwards
1. FC Nürnberg managers
German football managers